Alban Muja (born 10 September 1980) is a Kosovan contemporary artist and film-maker. In 2019 he represented Kosovo at the 58th Venice Biennale. In his work he is mostly influenced by the social, political and economical transformation processes in wider surrounding region, he investigates history and socio-political themes and links them to his position in Kosovo today. His works cover a wide range of media including video installation, films, drawings, paintings, photographs and performance which have been exhibited extensively in various exhibitions and festivals.

Exhibitions (selection)

2021 - ‘Beyond Borders', Center for Contemporary Arts, Celje, Slovenia
2021 - ‘Whatever Happens, We Will Be Prepared’, The National Gallery of Kosovo, Prishtina, Kosovo
2021 -‘In spite of everything, there is a wall' Charim Gallery, Vienna, Austria,
2021 - 'Family Album' ISCP, New York,
2021 - 3rd Autostrada Biennale - WHAT IF A JOURNEY..., Prizren, Kosovo
2021 - ‘Bigger Than Myself: Heroic Voices from Ex-Yugoslavia’ Maxxi Museum Rome, Italy
2020 – 3rd Industrial Art Biennial 'Ride Into the Sun' Rijeka, Croatia
2020 – Curated by 20 'HYBRID Unknown Identities' Galerie Raum mit Light, Vienna, Austria
2020 – Family Album, Ludwig Museum, Budapest, Hungary
2019 – 58th. Venice Biennale - May You Live In Interesting Times, La Biennale di Venezia, Venice, Italy
2019 – NSK State in Time, viennacontemporary Vienna, Austria
2019 – F.M The Process, Petrit Gallery, Cite des Arts, Paris, France
2019 – 'All That We Have In Common' MOMus Experimental Center for the Arts Thessaloniki, Greece
2018 – 'Stranger Than Paradise' MeetFactory Prague, Czech Republic
2018 – 'All That We Have In Common' Museum Of Contemporary Art Skopje, North Macedonia
2017 – Autostrada Biennale 2017 - The Future of Borders, Autostrada Biennale, Prizren, Kosovo
2017 – 'Symptoms of Society' Zhejiang Art Museum Hangzhou, China
2017 – 'Migration of fear' Koroska Gallery of Fine Arts Slovenj Gradec, Slovenia
2017 – Westkunst – Ostkunst. A Selection from the Collection, Ludwig Museum Budapest, Hungary
2017 – 'Utopia / Dystopia: Architecture, City, Territory' Mestna Galerija Ljubljana, Slovenia
2017 – 'The Travellers' Kumu Art Museum, Tallinn, Estonia
2017 – 'Symptoms of Society' Guangdong Museum of Art, Guangzhou, China
2017 – 'Migration of fear' Forum Stadpark, Graz, Austria
2016 – 'Omul Negru' Galeria Nicodim, Los Angeles
2016 – 'Brotherhood Phallicism' Museum of Fine Art, Split, Croatia
2016 – The whale that was a submarine' Ludwig Museum, Budapest, Hungary
2016 – 'The Travellers' Zacheta National Gallery of Art, Warsaw, Poland
2016 – 'Normalities' Austrian Cultural Forum, New York
2015 – 3rd Mardin Biennial - Mythologies, Mardin Biennial Mardin, Turkey
2015 – 'Theories on Forgetting' Gagosian Gallery, Beverly Hills
2015 – 'From Brotherhood to Brotherly Love' Museum of Modern and Contemporary Art of Rijeka, Rijeka, Croatia
2015 – 'From Brotherhood to Brotherly Love' 'Trieste Contemporanea, Trieste, Italy
2014 – 'I never knew how to explain' Skuc Gallery, Ljubljana, Slovenia
2014 – 'Balcony to the Balkans' Staatliche Kunsthalle Baden-Baden, Baden-Baden, Germany
2013 – 2nd Project Biennial Of Contemporary Art, D-0 Ark Underground Project Biennial of Contemporary Art, Konjic Bosnia and Herzegovina
2012 – 'Hebron Road/Ridge Route', Art Cube Gallery, Jerusalem
2012 – 'Mediterranean – Arrivals and Departure', Ancona, Italy
2012 – 'Cross-Time Stories' Wallach Art Gallery, Columbia University, New York
2011 – 'Spaceship Yugoslavia' NGBK, Berlin
2011 – 'Its all about names' KC Tobacna 001-Mesnta Museum, Ljubljana, Slovenia
2011 – 'Politics of naming' Myymala2 Gallery, Helsinki, Finland
2011 – '255 804 km2' – Brot Kunsthalle, Vienna, Austria
2010 – 'The Another Side of The Coin' Škuc Gallery, Ljubljana, Slovenia
2010 – 'Qui Vive?' Moscow International Biennale, Moscow
2010 – 'Spasticus Artisticus' Ceri Hand Gallery, Liverpool
2009 – 28th Biennial of Graphic Arts Ljubljana, Slovenia

Personal life
Born in Mitrovica, SFR Yugoslavia, now Kosovo. Muja lives and works in Pristina and Berlin
He graduated with a Bachelor and Master's degree from the Faculty of Arts, University of Pristina. He is married to photographer and former model Albe Hamiti.

References

1980 births
Living people
Date of birth missing (living people)
Place of birth missing (living people)
Kosovan filmmakers
Albanian artists